Music Shop or The Music Shop may refer to:
 Music store, retail business that sells musical instruments and related accessories
 Music Shop, a/k/a ABC Music Shop, 1955 British musical programme on ITV with Arthur Murphy (broadcaster)#Abroad
 The Music Shop (TV program), 1959 American music program on NBC
 Music Shop (TV program), 1972–84 West German music program on Radio Bremen; original title Musikladen
 The Music Shop (TV series), 1996–98 Australian children's series on Network Ten
 The Music Shop, 2017 novel by English author Rachel Joyce